Ferenc Pavlics (born 3 February 1928) is a Hungarian-born American mechanical engineer who developed the Apollo Lunar rover.

Early life
Ferenc Pavlics was born in Balozsameggyes (Vas county, Hungary) on February 3, 1928. His father Károly Pavlics and mother Rosina Perusich were both teachers teaching in the elementary school of Balozsameggyes. At the age of six he almost died from a severe illness. After an operation he recovered.

As a child, Ferenc Pavlics attended the elementary school of Balozsameggyes. During the first years he was taught by his mother then his father. He attended the Faludi Ferenc high school in Szombathely and graduated in 1946.  Pavlics attended the Budapest University of Technology and Economics and graduated as a mechanical engineer in 1950.

Pavlics was working in the Gépipari Tervező Intézet (Industrial Machine Planning Institute). After the Hungarian Revolution of 1956, the Pavlics family scattered around the world. Ferenc and his future wife Klára Schwáb went first to Austria, then to the United States. Three of his brothers and sisters also left Hungary, Anna settled in Austria, József in Sweden, Teréz also in the USA, California.

Working on space projects

After leaving Hungary, Pavlics first was working from 1957 in the General Motors (GM) Research Division, Detroit. From 1961 he continued his work in the Santa Barbara Division of GM developing overlands. He continued his postgraduate studies.

Later for the NASA JPL and Boeing Company he started the development of the Lunar Roving Vehicle.

The rover had a total mass of 210 kg and was designed to carry a payload of an additional 490 kg. Each wheel had a 190 W (0.25 horsepower) motor (so the full motor power of the rover was 1 HP). It had a special vehicle design to be able to move on the special surface conditions of the Moon. Their frames were made of aluminum alloy. (See more details: Lunar rover.)

In 1971 the Apollo 15 carried the first Lunar rover to the Moon. In 1972 the Apollo 16 and Apollo 17 also carried Lunar rovers. All three vehicles remained on the Moon.

In 1971 Pavlics got a NASA award for the success of the Apollo program.

Later Pavlics participated in the development of hybrid and fuel cell driven vehicles and the electric bus network of Santa Barbara.

See also
Lunar rover
Apollo program
List of artificial objects on the Moon

References

External links
Technical University of Budapest
Budapesti Műszaki Egyetem (Hungarian)

Living people
1928 births
Hungarian emigrants to the United States
Hungarian mechanical engineers
NASA people
Hungarian aerospace engineers